Buzzkill is a hidden-camera reality show which started airing in 1996 on the MTV network. The show derived its name from the slang term buzzkill, meaning a sudden undesired event that causes one's "high" or "buzz" to become of a lesser experience or depleted. Each new episode was set in a different location and consisted of three separate pranks.

Premise
A forerunner to prank reality shows, Buzzkill was essentially a series of elaborate pranks (backed by a major television network's budget) played not only on the layman but often on celebrities and major public figures. Each prank was played by three aspiring actors from the Chicago area: Dave Sheridan (creator), Frank Hudetz, and Travis Draft.

The show's most memorable moment was when Hudetz disguised himself as famous designer Isaac Mizrahi. The likeness was so uncanny that he fooled superstar Whitney Houston at an awards show; when Houston discovered the error, she felt she was made a fool of and vowed never to appear on MTV again.

The show was eventually cancelled due to litigation concerns at MTV. Because of Buzzkill, more outrageous reality shows were developed for MTV, including The Tom Green Show, Jackass, and Punk'd.

The show's theme song uses the same verse and chorus melody as the GG Allin classic 'Multiple Forms of Self-Satisfaction'.

Episode guide

References

External links
 
 Jump The Shark – Buzzkill
An oral history of Buzzkill

MTV reality television series
1990s American comedy television series
1996 American television series debuts
1996 American television series endings
American hidden camera television series